Chester, New York may refer to:

 Chester (village), New York, a village in Orange County, New York, United States
 Chester, Orange County, New York, a town in Orange County, New York, United States
 Chester, Warren County, New York, a town in Warren County, New York, United States

See also
 Chestertown, New York, a hamlet in Warren County, New York, United States
 Port Chester, New York, a village in Westchester County, New York, United States